NTD is an Australian television station, licensed to and serving Darwin, Palmerston and surrounding areas. The station is owned and operated by the Nine Entertainment Co., and is an owned-and-operated station of the Nine Network, under the company name Territory Television Pty. Ltd.

The station is known for being the only commercial television network in the Northern Territory to broadcast a full Darwin news bulletin on weeknights. The network has also produced local programs airing across the entire Nine Network, such as Driving Test (2018) and Catching the Chase: Barra Nationals (2018).

History

Origins
NTD-8 was officially launched at 8:00pm on 11 November 1971, with the opening lineup beginning at 5:30pm with Skippy the Bush Kangaroo, followed by Bandstand at 6:00 p.m. and at 7:00 p.m., An Evening with Burt Bacharach.

The station was officially inaugurated at 8:00pm by Northern Territory Administrator, Fred Chaney, followed by speeches from Sir Myles Wright, Fred Yates, John Hickman, and assistant executive John May.

The opening lineup continued with All the King's Men at 8:30 p.m. and Danger Man at 10:30 p.m. The station closed for the night at 11:30 p.m.

The station was completely destroyed by Cyclone Tracy in December 1974 and was off air for 10 months while it was rebuilt entirely.
The station reopened at 6 Blake Street in the Darwin suburb of The Gardens, with full colour, on 27 October 1975 with John Lewis as Manager, with on air operators Gavin Ashton, Steve Mariner and Ross Jamieson. Daryl Potts was Chief Engineer until he died in 1979. Robert Potts was Studio Cameraman Film Department / Trainee location 16mm Cameraman / On Air Operator.

1980s
NTD did not run any news and current affairs programming until 18 October 1982, after the station hired Rex Clark as a news director to launch a nightly bulletin at 7:00pm entitled News at Seven, alongside a current affairs program entitled Spectrum.

1981 Daytime chat show 'Grapevine' hosted by Judith Noble (née Billington; Balcazar since 1990) Live on-air presentation directed and produced by Peter Miller; cameraman Headly Trigg.

In the late 1980s, NTD was purchased by Publishing and Broadcasting Limited (PBL), the owners of the Nine Network at that time. Following the purchase, NTD adopted a similar on-air presentation to the Nine Network, though replacing the "9" with an "8". NTD's news service was revamped and rebranded along with the station, to become Eight National News.

1990s

NTD was the sole commercial television station in Darwin until 1998, when Telecasters Australia launched Seven Darwin. However, for several years, NTD remained the sole locally based station in the city, as Seven Darwin was little more than a relay for Seven Central.

Territory Television Pty. Ltd. attempted to gain Seven Network affiliation rights prior to Seven Darwin's launch, in a strategic move to dominate and force the incoming competitor to align with Network Ten. This would have seen NTD broadcast both Nine Network and Seven Network programming, however after being rejected affiliation, the station gained Network Ten affiliation to supplement their parent company's Nine Network programming.

2000s
On New Year's Day 2003, Eight Darwin became Nine Darwin, in line with the rest of Kerry Packer's Nine Network owned-and-operated stations.  At the same time, the station dropped most Ten programming from the line-up, and in 2005, the Network Ten affiliation rights were officially relinquished, and were then taken by TND in 2005.

In 2005, in the midst of the tug-of-war for the AFL television rights, PBL announced that National Rugby League games will take precedence on the station over AFL games, a sign that Nine may have been about to give up the race for the rights to a proposed Seven-Ten consortium, which they did, but not without putting in a $780 million dollar bid for the rights.

In 2008, Nine Darwin (NTD) began broadcasting Nine HD. In April 2008, Darwin Digital Television (DTD), a joint venture between the Nine Network and Macquarie Southern Cross Media, began broadcasting on the digital terrestrial platform as a full-time Ten Network affiliate.

The same year, it was speculated that Imparja Television, the Nine affiliate for most of the rest of the Territory, was planning to purchase the station from the Nine Network. The deal would have involved the sale of the station, as well as its facilities and licence. Negotiations for the sale of the station fell through on 29 September, when Imparja failed to secure federal government funding to help finance the takeover.

2010s
The analogue signal for NTD was turned off at 9.00am CST on Tuesday 30 July 2013.

In July 2017, it was reported that the station's nightly news program, Nine News Darwin, would move its studio presentation from Darwin to Nine's Brisbane studios and replace local weekend bulletins with delayed broadcasts of the Queensland bulletin. The last standalone edition of Nine News Darwin aired on 8 September 2017. The bulletin returned on Monday 11 September 2017, in a new regional hub in Brisbane. The changes were heavily criticised by the public, with 12 employees at the network being made redundant or offered redeployment in other locations. After the initial cuts, the newsroom was left with a chief of staff, four reporters and four camera operators filing reports interstate. Subsequent cuts further reduced the newsroom with a chief of staff, three reporters and three camera operators.

In April 2019, the network made the announcement that they will be decommissioning the Blake Street studios to move to a newer site in the Darwin CBD on Mitchell Street. NTD moved to the new facility in December 2019. It spans across two floors with general offices, a newsroom and a studio. It is expected the former site will be sold, demolished and replaced with residential high-rises.

Programming

Nine News Darwin 
The station's local news service, Nine News Darwin, airs at 6:00pm each weeknight. The news reports are filed from the NTD newsroom in Darwin and the bulletin is aired live from the QTQ studios in Brisbane. Reporters and camera crews covering the Darwin area are based locally at the NTD studios. Afternoon and weekend bulletins are a delayed broadcast of Nine Afternoon News Sydney and Nine News Queensland, with no local opt-outs, respectively. The weeknight bulletin is simulcasted on radio on 104.1 Territory FM, and also airs on Imparja GEM as a delayed broadcast for viewers outside of NTD's broadcasting area.

Nine News Darwin was launched on 18 October 1982 as Eight News at Seven, alongside a current affairs program entitled Spectrum. The news service was later rebranded to Eight National News in the late 1980s.

On New Year's Day 2003, the news service was revamped following the change of branding to Nine Darwin across the station. The service became National Nine News on weeknights from 6:00pm with local news and weather opt-outs during the Sydney bulletin on weekends.

In July 2011, the station debuted a new look for their news service including a new set to match those used in the metropolitan bulletins. This also included the implementation of locally produced weekend news bulletins for the Darwin area, presented by Amy Culpitt.

In April 2016, Nine News Darwin expanded to one hour between 6:00pm and 7:00pm nightly.

In September 2017, the bulletin relocated its studio presentation from Darwin to the Brisbane studios, with the last locally produced bulletin from the NTD studios aired on 8 September. The format, first aired on 11 September, was presented as a recorded joint interstate composite bulletin with regional Queensland and was anchored by Jonathan Uptin and Samantha Heathwood. The bulletin included opt-outs for local news, sport and weather. In February 2018, Uptin was promoted as the sports and weekend presenter for Nine News Queensland and was subsequently replaced by Paul Taylor.

In March 2020, the Nine Network temporarily suspended their regional news bulletins due to the COVID-19 pandemic. As a result, Nine News Darwin reverted to a short, local format from NTD's makeshift studio. Anchored by Kathleen Gazzola, and also presented by Zarisha Bradley, Amy Clements and Tahlia Sarv, they are shown as opt-outs during the Queensland bulletin from 6:30pm as well as during advertisement breaks at primetime. Smaller news segments, as well as news coverage during weekends, are uploaded to the Nine News Darwin Facebook page.

On 15 September 2020, it was announced that Nine News Darwin will return to air weeknights from 5 October 2020, returning to the previous dedicated live local format seen in pre-2017. Paul Taylor returned as its main presenter, with local reporters on rotation to present the weather in various locations across Darwin.

Presenters and reporters

Main presenter 
 Paul Taylor (2017–present)
Fill-in presenter(s)

 Paul Murphy (2018–present)

Reporters 
 Amy Sinclair (also Chief of Staff)
 Kathleen Gazzola
 Tahlia Sarv
 Amy Clements
 Jack Hahn

Former on-air staff

Jake Hauritz (sport presenter) 
Charles Croucher (sport and weekend presenter, now Nine's political editor)
Kyrrie Blenkinsop (sport and weekend presenter)
Angelina Anictomatis (sport and weekend presenter)
Lisa Andrews (sport and weekend presenter)
Zara James (weekend presenter, now with Nine News Sydney)
Leah Hannon
Tim Arvier (now with Nine News Queensland)
David Fidler
Theona Mitaros (her daughter, Elle Georgiou, is a reporter on Seven News Perth)
Jonathan Uptin (now Nine News Queensland presenter)
Amy Culpitt (now ABC News NT weekend presenter)
Henry Jones (sport presenter)
Samantha Heathwood (now with Seven News Queensland)
Notes

References

External links
Nine Network

	

Television stations in Darwin, Northern Territory
Nine Network
Television channels and stations established in 1971